The following is a list of Special Protection Areas in the Republic of Ireland known as SPA, as listed by the National Parks and Wildlife Service (NPWS). The Special Protection Areas are designated areas of protection under the European Union Birds Directive and are in place to protect rare and vulnerable bird species, migratory bird species, and wetlands that are deemed to be internationally important.

Connacht

Leinster

Munster

Ulster

References

Sources
 Special Protection Areas (SPA) dataset from the National Park and Wildlife Service available under CC-BY-SA 4.0 licence

External links
 Datasets - Natura 2000
 Datasets Viewer - Natura 2000
 Natura 2000 Sites for Nature Conservation

Special Protection Areas in the Republic of Ireland